Jenny Sunderland (born 13 March 1954) is an Australian gymnast. She competed at the 1972 Summer Olympics.

Her nephew, Scott Sunderland, competed in cycling at the 2012 London Olympics.

References

External links
 

1954 births
Living people
Australian female artistic gymnasts
Olympic gymnasts of Australia
Gymnasts at the 1972 Summer Olympics
Place of birth missing (living people)
20th-century Australian women